Frontier Marshal is a 1934 American Pre-Code Western film directed by Lewis Seiler and starring George O'Brien. Produced by Fox Film and Sol M. Wurtzel, the film is the first based on Stuart N. Lake's enormously popular but largely fictitious "biography" of Wyatt Earp,  Wyatt Earp: Frontier Marshal. A second version of the film, also produced by Wurtzel, was made in 1939, and a third interpretation by John Ford entitled My Darling Clementine was released in 1946.

He supposedly wrote the book with Earp's input, and it portrays Earp as a fearless lawman. But before the first movie was released, his widow Josephine Earp sued 20th Century Fox for $50,000 in an attempt to keep them from making the film. She said it was an "unauthorized portrayal" of Wyatt Earp. She succeeded in getting Earp's name completely excised from the movie. His character was renamed "Michael Wyatt," and the movie was released as Frontier Marshal.

Plot 
Wandering lawman Michael Wyatt rides into a lawless town and runs into conflict with the local boss, Doc Warren.

Cast 
 George O'Brien as Michael Wyatt
 Irene Bentley as Mary Reid
 George E. Stone as David 'Abe' Ruskin
 Alan Edwards as Doc Warren
 Ruth Gillette as Queenie LaVerne
 Berton Churchill as Ben 'Hiram' Melton
 Frank Conroy as George 'Oscar' Reid
 Ward Bond as Ben Murchison
 Edward LeSaint as Judge Walters
 Russell Simpson as Editor Pickett

Production 
Actor Ward Bond appears in three films based on the Wyatt Earp story and Lake's spurious book: this film, the 1939 version and John Ford's My Darling Clementine (1946), playing different roles in all three.

References

External links
 
 

1934 films
American black-and-white films
1934 Western (genre) films
Films directed by Lewis Seiler
American Western (genre) films
Cultural depictions of Wyatt Earp
Fox Film films
1930s English-language films
1930s American films